James Harvey (born 2 May 1958) is a Northern Irish football manager and former player.

Playing career
As a player, Harvey began his career at Glenavon in his hometown of Lurgan, before joining Arsenal in 1977. He made only three Football League appearances and one UEFA Cup appearance in three years, with his debut coming against Derby County on 9 May 1978.

Harvey moved to Hereford United in 1980, where he made 278 league appearances. He had a brief spell at Bristol City and then on loan to Wrexham, before moving to Tranmere Rovers in 1987; there he played 239 matches, scoring 19 goals, and became club captain. At Tranmere, he was the playmaker for a team who gained two promotions and won the Football League Trophy final in 1990.

Spells at Crewe Alexandra, Southport and Chester City (youth coach) followed, and he finished his playing career as player-manager at Morecambe.

Managerial career
Harvey joined Morecambe as player-manager in July 1994 and led them into the Football Conference in 1996. In 1998, he managed Morecambe to the Conference League Cup title, beating Woking in the Final. He also led Morecambe to second place in the Conference in 2003, before being defeated on a penalty shootout in the semi-final against Dagenham & Redbridge. He also served as assistant manager to long-time friend Sammy McIlroy when McIlroy was in charge of the Northern Ireland national team.

Harvey suffered a heart attack before a league match against Cambridge United in November 2005. Whilst Harvey was given time off to recuperate, McIlroy was installed as caretaker manager. McIlroy took Morecambe into the play-offs during Harvey's absence, and on Harvey's first day back after his illness in May 2006, he was sacked with McIlroy being installed as permanent manager in his place. Harvey's sacking from Morecambe has led to serious animosity between the two former friends and colleagues; they refused to shake hands when Harvey's Forest Green side met McIlroy's Morecambe at Christie Park in November 2006.

After spending the pre-season coaching at Crewe Alexandra, in September 2006, Harvey replaced Gary Owers to become Forest Green Rovers' seventh manager in nine seasons. He took over a team, bottom of the Conference with just 2 points from the first six games and led them to safety with a game to spare. In his second season as Forest Green boss he led the club to its highest ever league finish of 8th in the Conference National under his guidance. He then led the club to the third round of the FA Cup in his third season at Forest Green where they narrowly lost 4–3 to Championship side Derby County. In the same season he took Forest Green into the Conference League Cup Final following a 1–0 away win at Ebbsfleet United in the semi finals however Forest Green lost in the final to AFC Telford United 0–3 on penalties after the game finished goalless. He left the club in August 2009.

On 6 October 2009, Harvey was appointed manager of Chester City until the end of the 2009–10 season, where he had previously been part of the coaching staff in the mid-1990s.
 However Harvey resigned in January 2010 because of uncertainty regarding his future.
On 12 February 2010 Harvey was appointed manager of Stalybridge Celtic in the Conference North. He left the club in October 2013.

On 1 June 2015, it was confirmed that he had joined League One side Oldham Athletic as part of the coaching staff. On 1 October 2015, Harvey was appointed as assistant manager to Darren Kelly at FC Halifax Town. On 22 December 2015, Harvey was appointed as manager of the club, following a spell as caretaker manager. While the club's form improved under him, and they were victorious in the 2016 FA Trophy Final, they were ultimately relegated after failing to win their final game of the season, and Harvey was not offered the chance to continue.

On 7 December 2016, Jim Harvey sacked as Altrincham boss after just one league win in three months.

Managerial statistics

Honours

Player
Individual
PFA Team of the Year: 1988–89 Fourth Division, 1989–90 Third Division

Manager
FC Halifax Town
FA Trophy: 2015–16

Individual
 Football Conference Manager of the Month: April 2003

References

1958 births
Living people
People from Lurgan
Association footballers from Northern Ireland
Association football midfielders
Arsenal F.C. players
Hereford United F.C. players
Bristol City F.C. players
Wrexham A.F.C. players
Tranmere Rovers F.C. players
Crewe Alexandra F.C. players
Southport F.C. players
Chester City F.C. players
Morecambe F.C. players
English Football League players
National League (English football) players
Football managers from Northern Ireland
Morecambe F.C. managers
Forest Green Rovers F.C. managers
Chester City F.C. managers
Stalybridge Celtic F.C. managers
National League (English football) managers
Chester City F.C. non-playing staff
Oldham Athletic A.F.C. non-playing staff
Altrincham F.C. managers
FC Halifax Town non-playing staff